The 2006–07 season was Colchester United's 65th season in their history and their first-ever season in the second tier of English football, the Championship. Alongside competing in the Championship, the club also participated in the FA Cup and League Cup.

Following Colchester's promotion from League One, bookmakers had the U's as favourites for an immediate return to the third tier, especially following manager Phil Parkinson's acrimonious resignation and subsequent appointment at Hull City. However, under the guidance of Parkinson's former assistant manager Geraint Williams, Colchester achieved a 10th-place finish in the league, defying the odds and a club record best ever league finish. Indeed, Colchester found themselves on the edges of the play-off positions for much of the season, eventually ending the campaign six points shy after a patch of poor form in February and March.

Colchester for the first time ever entered the FA Cup at the third round stage, but were immediately eliminated by League Two Barnet. They suffered a similar fate in the League Cup when another League Two club Milton Keynes Dons knocked the U's out of the competition in extra time.

Season overview
On 13 June 2006, manager Phil Parkinson who had led Colchester to their first ever promotion to the second tier, resigned. It was a situation reminiscent of George Burley's resignation and move to Ipswich Town in the 1994–95 season. Hull City's chairman Adam Pearson had approached Parkinson illegally regarding their vacant managers position, and as with Ipswich before, was made to pay when Colchester chairman Peter Heard won £400,000 in damages for the club.

New club owner Robbie Cowling's first task was to appoint Parkinson's successor, with Parkinson's former assistant Geraint Williams overseeing pre-season training. He was ultimately appointed following a lengthy recruitment process and charged with leading United into their first season in the Championship. Mick Harford was brought in as his assistant.

On the back of a successful 2005–06 season for midfielder Neil Danns, scoring 15 goals, he left for Birmingham City in a deal worth up to £850,000. Incoming were former U's loanees Jamie Cureton and Johnnie Jackson.

After a solid yet unsuccessful start to the season, Colchester were without a win after four games, albeit defeats by a single goal on each occasion. They earned their first Championship victory on 26 August when they beat Derby County 4–3 courtesy of a Cureton hat-trick. Colchester then hosted Ipswich Town in the first league derby between the two neighbouring sides for 49 years. Colchester stalwart Karl Duguid's goal was enough to hand the U's victory. Parkinson returned to Layer Road with his struggling Hull side in November as Chris Iwelumo equalled a club record and scored four for himself as the U's beat the Tigers 5–1. Parkinson was sacked by Hull five days later after Colchester's eighth successive home victory on their way to eleven consecutive home victories in the league. By Christmas, the U's found themselves in the play-off positions.

Talk at this point turned to the potential for the U's to ground-share Portman Road with Ipswich Town if they achieved the ultimate dream of promotion to the Premier League as the first turf was cut on the new stadium development at Cuckoo Farm.

In January, the U's received a club record £2.5m from Reading for their England under-20s international Greg Halford.

With two games to spare, Colchester were just one point off the play-off places. Defeat at main rivals Stoke City ended their hopes but the 10th-placed finish was the best in the club's history, making them 30th of all clubs in the English football pyramid. Gates at Layer Road had risen to an average of 5,466, the highest since the 1970–71 season with most games sold out.

Players

Transfers

In

 Total spending:  ~ £0

Out

 Total incoming:  ~ £3,000,000

Loans in

Loans out

Match details

Championship

League table

Results round by round

Matches

Football League Cup

FA Cup

Squad statistics

Appearances and goals

|-
!colspan="16"|Players who appeared for Colchester who left during the season

|}

Goalscorers

Disciplinary record

Clean sheets
Number of games goalkeepers kept a clean sheet.

Player debuts
Players making their first-team Colchester United debut in a fully competitive match.

See also
List of Colchester United F.C. seasons

References

General
Books

Websites

Specific

2006-07
2006–07 Football League Championship by team